Plastic Parachute is an American Pop band based in Los Angeles, California. Parachute tunes have been heard on MTV and CBS programming as well as Jeep/Chrysler commercials and Warren Miller/Time Warner Extreme Ski Films.

Winning Los Angeles' Rock City News "Best Female Fronted Band", Plastic Parachute plays over 250 shows a year nationally and at LA rock clubs such as The Viper Room, The Knitting Factory, The Keyclub, The Cat Club, The Dragonfly & House Of Blues.  Plastic Parachute is Clint, Ricky, Birdee, MichaelAngelo and Brian. Currently working with producer Ron Saint Germain.

Discography

Albums
 Elephants & Giraffes  (produced & mixed by Dave Darling.  Betty Ford Princess mixed by Mike Shipley)
 Swell (produced & mixed by Dave Darling)

External links
 Plastic Parachute Official Site
 Plastic Parachute MySpace

Rock music groups from California
American pop rock music groups
Musical groups from Los Angeles